Armytage is a surname. Notable people with the surname include:

 Jack Armytage (1872–1943), Canadian ice hockey player
 James Charles Armytage (1802 or ca. 1820–1897), English engraver
 Sir John Armytage (1732–1758), 2nd Baronet and British politician
 Sir George Armytage (politician) (1734–1783), 3rd Baronet and British politician
George Armytage (grazier) (1795–1862) grazier in Australia
 Marcus Armytage, jockey
 Samantha Armytage (born 1977), Australian journalist and television news presenter

See also
 Armytage baronets, baronetcies created for members of the Armytage family
 Green Armytage forceps, medical instruments